Fimbristylis cinnamometorum is a sedge of the family Cyperaceae that is native to Australia.

It blooms between April and June and produces brown flowers.

In Western Australia it is found in and around swamps, pools along drainage lines and clay-pans and other damp places in the Kimberley region where it grows in loamy soils around sandstone and quartzite.

References

Plants described in 1837
Flora of Western Australia
cinnamometorum